Carlos Omaña (born 8 February 1993) is a Venezuelan swimmer. He competed in the men's 200 metre backstroke event at the 2017 World Aquatics Championships.

References

1993 births
Living people
Venezuelan male swimmers
Place of birth missing (living people)
Swimmers at the 2015 Pan American Games
Male backstroke swimmers
Pan American Games competitors for Venezuela
21st-century Venezuelan people